The Love for Three Oranges is a 1919 opera by Sergei Prokofiev.

The Love for Three Oranges can also refer to:

The Love for Three Oranges (fairy tale), Italian fairy tale by Giambattista Basile in Pentamerone

See also
"The Love of Three Oranges" (Dad's Army), a 1976 Christmas episode of British series Dad's Army